Fabio Vio Ugarte (born 1949) is a Chilean lawyer who has served as ambassador of Chile in different countries. He has also gained prominence in Chile as an international analyst, specifically on the affairs of Peru.

Besides his native language, he also speaks English and French.

Diplomatic career
In 1992, he was appointed Head of Bilateral Policy of the Ministry of Foreign Affairs. In 1994, he was appointed Director-General of Foreign Policy of Foreign Affairs, a position he held until November 1997. 

From 1994 to 1997, he was a full member of the Council of Foreign Policy of his country as well as national coordinator of the Rio Group and national coordinator of the Conference of Ibero-American countries. From 1995 to 1997, he represented Chile as guarantor in the Controversy between Peru and Ecuador. As such, he signed the Brasilia Presidential Act in 1995.

In 1994, Vio was the Coordinator of Chile at the Summit of the Americas held in Miami. In 1996, he was Pro-Tempore Secretary of the Ibero-American Summit held in Santiago de Chile. In 1997, he represented to his country before the same pro-tempore mechanism of Mercosur.

From 1998 to 2000, he was the representative of Chile to the OECD Development Center. Similarly, from 1997 to 2000, Vío was ambassador to France.

From 2002 to 2006 he was ambassador of Chile to Hugo Chávez's Venezuela in replacement of the radical Marcos Álvarez, who recognized Pedro Carmona Estanga's de facto government after the 2002 coup attempt.

In 2008, he was appointed by President Michelle Bachelet as ambassador of Chile to Paraguay. Then, in October of that, Vio was appointed as ambassador to Peru.

Condecorations
 Commendatore of the Ordre national du Mérite from France.
 Commendatore of the Legion of Honour from France.
 Commendatore of the Order of May from Argentina.
 Commendatore of the Order of Civil Merit from Spain.
 Commendatore of the Order of Rio Branco from Brazil.
 Grand Cross of the Order of the Polar Star from Sweden.
 Grand Officer of the Order of San Carlos from Colombia.
 Grand Cross of the National Order of Merit from Ecuador.
 Decoration of Honour for Services to the Republic of Austria.
 Order of Merit of the Italian Republic
 Grand Cross of the Order of the Sun of Peru.

References

External Links
 Vío's columns at Opinión Global

1949 births
Ambassadors of Chile to Paraguay
Living people
Ambassadors of Chile to Peru
20th-century Chilean lawyers
Pontifical Catholic University of Valparaíso alumni

Ambassadors of Chile to Poland
Ambassadors of Chile to France
Ambassadors of Chile to Venezuela
Commandeurs of the Légion d'honneur
Grand Crosses of the Order of the Sun of Peru
Recipients of the Decoration for Services to the Republic of Austria
Recipients of the Order of Merit of the Italian Republic
Commanders Grand Cross of the Order of the Polar Star
Order of Civil Merit members
20th-century diplomats
People from Valparaíso
21st-century diplomats